ROKS Marado (LPH-6112) is the second ship of the  of the Republic of Korea Navy.

Differences with ROKS Dokdo 
Marado was built with some changes compared to the lead ship . The flight deck is adapted to accommodate two V-22 Ospreys, while Dokdo was able to only carry one. In place of the Thales SMART-L multibeam radar and MW08 surveillance radar, Marado uses the Elta Systems EL/M-2248 MF-STAR multifunction surveillance radar and LIG Nex1 SPS-550K 3-D air and surface surveillance radar. It also has a different weapons suite than the 30 mm Goalkeeper and RAM, instead using two 20 mm Phalanx CIWS and having a K-VLS at the rear of the superstructure for the locally developed K-SAAM.

Construction and Career 
The Marado was launched on 14 May 2018 at the shipyard of Hanjin Heavy Industries & Constructions Co. in Busan. The Marado was commissioned on 28 June 2021 and is based at the Jinhae Naval Base.

Marado was originally planned to enter service 2010. In 2012 the budget was restored after the rise of tensions in the region.

Construction started in November 2016 with the first steel being cut. The keel was laid down in April the following year and the launch occurring another year later. The following two years consisted of fitting-out and going through sea trials. The ship was commissioned on 28 June 2021 .

In May 2022, the ROKN announced that the Marado and the Sohn Won-yil-class submarine, ROKS ''Shin Dol-seok SS-082, will take part in the RIMPAC 2022.

See also 
 
 
 
 Project 23900 amphibious assault ship

References 

Dokdo-class amphibious assault ships
2018 ships
Ships built by Hanjin Heavy Industries